The Dance of the Dead is a Big Finish Productions audio drama featuring Lisa Bowerman as Bernice Summerfield, a character from the spin-off media based on the long-running British science fiction television series Doctor Who.

Plot 
Bernice finds herself hungover on a space cruiser. Suddenly, explosions rock the ship and she has to join forces with Ice Warriors and a bored steward in order to survive.

Cast
Bernice Summerfield – Lisa Bowerman
Grand Marshal Sstac – Matthew Brenher
Karter – Francis Magee
General Azzar – Vivien Parry

External links
Big Finish Productions - Professor Bernice Summerfield: The Dance of the Dead

Bernice Summerfield audio plays
Plays by Stephen Cole
2002 audio plays
Fiction set in the 27th century